The following is the final results of the 1997 World Wrestling Championships. Men's Freestyle competition were held in Krasnoyarsk, Russia. Men's Greco-Roman competition were held in Wrocław, Poland and Women's competition were held in Clermont-Ferrand, France.

Medal table

Team ranking

Medal summary

Men's freestyle

Men's Greco-Roman

Women's freestyle

Participating nations

Men's freestyle
220 competitors from 45 nations participated.

 (5)
 (5)
 (6)
 (8)
 (2)
 (6)
 (8)
 (7)
 (2)
 (8)
 (1)
 (3)
 (2)
 (7)
 (7)
 (2)
 (5)
 (5)
 (8)
 (1)
 (3)
 (8)
 (8)
 (7)
 (2)
 (1)
 (5)
 (2)
 (1)
 (8)
 (1)
 (2)
 (6)
 (3)
 (8)
 (4)
 (2)
 (8)
 (3)
 (1)
 (8)
 (8)
 (8)
 (7)
 (8)

Men's Greco-Roman
227 competitors from 47 nations participated.

 (5)
 (2)
 (4)
 (7)
 (6)
 (6)
 (2)
 (2)
 (6)
 (8)
 (1)
 (6)
 (7)
 (6)
 (8)
 (8)
 (8)
 (7)
 (3)
 (3)
 (1)
 (8)
 (5)
 (3)
 (3)
 (1)
 (4)
 (2)
 (2)
 (1)
 (2)
 (8)
 (2)
 (6)
 (8)
 (4)
 (8)
 (2)
 (8)
 (2)
 (1)
 (8)
 (8)
 (8)
 (4)
 (8)
 (5)

Women's freestyle
92 competitors from 21 nations participated.

 (5)
 (4)
 (3)
 (5)
 (5)
 (6)
 (2)
 (6)
 (5)
 (3)
 (5)
 (6)
 (4)
 (4)
 (6)
 (2)
 (1)
 (3)
 (6)
 (6)
 (5)

References

Complete results from Women's World Wrestling Championships
Final Freestyle World Championships release

External links
UWW Database

 
World Wrestling Championships
W
W
W
W
W
W
W